An outlaw is a person living outside the law.

Outlaws or The Outlaws may also refer to:

Film and television

Film
 The Outlaws (1950 film), an Italian crime film
 Outlaws (1985 film), a French film
 The Outlaws (2017 film), a South Korean film
 Outlaws (2017 film), or 1%, an Australian film
 Outlaws (2021 film), a Spanish film
 The Out-Laws (film), an upcoming American film

Television
 Outlaws (1960 TV series), an American Western television series
 Outlaws (1986 TV series), an American action-adventure series
 Outlaws (2004 TV series), a UK drama
 The Out-Laws (2012 TV series), the UK title of the Flemish series Clan
 The Outlaws (2021 TV series), a UK comedy crime series
 "Outlaws" (Lost), a 2005 episode

Literature
 The Outlaws, characters in the Just William series of children's books by Richmal Crompton
 The Outlaws, a novel in The Bikers series by Richard Gordon
 The Outlaws, a novel in The Presidential Agent series by W. E. B. Griffin
 The Outlaws (comics), a team of super-villains in Marvel Comics
 The Outlaws (novel), a 1930 novel by Ernst von Salomon

Music
 Wanted! The Outlaws, a 1976 compilation album of recordings by Waylon Jennings, Willie Nelson, Jessi Colter, and Tompall Glaser
 "Outlaws", a song by Green Day from the 2016 album Revolution Radio
 Outlaws (band), an American southern rock band
 Outlaws (Outlaws album), the band's 1975 debut album
 The Outlaws (band), a 1960s English instrumental band
 Outlaws (Luke Doucet album), 2004
 Outlaws (Jeremy Steig and Eddie Gómez album), 1977
 Outlawz, an American rap group

Video games
 Outlaws (1985 video game), a shooter game for the Commodore 64
 Outlaws (1997 video game), a first-person shooter for the PC
 Houston Outlaws, an American professional eSports team in the Overwatch League

Sports

Bosnia and Herzegovina 
 Outlaws, a subgroup of the organized Ultras group Horde Zla

Ireland
 Tallaght Outlaws, an Irish American Football League team

United Kingdom
 Nottingham Outlaws (rugby league team), a National Division team
 Nottinghamshire County Cricket Club, known as Nottinghamshire Outlaws in limited overs competition

United States
 Arizona Outlaws, a United States Football League team, also known as the Oklahoma Outlaws
 Austin Outlaws, a National Women's Football Association team
 Billings Outlaws, a National Indoor Football League team
 Chico Outlaws, a Golden Baseball League team
 Denver Outlaws, a Major League Lacrosse team
 Houston Outlaws (RFL team), a professional football team in 1999
 Kansas City Outlaws, a United Hockey League team
 Las Vegas Outlaws (XFL), a former professional football team from the XFL
 Las Vegas Outlaws (arena football), an Arena Football League team
 Nashville Outlaws, a wooden bat summer collegiate baseball team
 Osceola Ghostriders, previously the Osceola Outlaws, a National Indoor Football League team
 Ventura Outlaws, a rugby team in the Southern California Rugby Football Union Blue Division

Tag-team wrestling
 The New Age Outlaws, a professional wrestling tag-team
 The Texas Outlaws (original version), a former professional tag-team consisting of Dusty Rhodes and Dick Murdoch
 The Texas Outlaws, former tag-team champions in the United States Wrestling Association

Other uses
 Outlaws Motorcycle Club

See also
 Outlaw (disambiguation)
 The Outlaws of Sherwood